Zymosterol is an intermediate in cholesterol biosynthesis. Disregarding some intermediate compounds (e.g. 4-4-dimethylzymosterol) lanosterol can be considered a precursor of zymosterol in the cholesterol synthesis pathway. The conversion of zymosterol into cholesterol happens in the endoplasmic reticulum. Zymosterol accumulates quickly in the plasma membrane coming from the cytosol. The movement of zymosterol across the cytosol is more than twice as fast as the movement of cholesterol itself. 

Cholestanes
Sterols